Pic du Gar is a mountain of the Pyrenees. It is located near Saint-Béat, Haute-Garonne département, in the Comminges natural region.

Despite its relatively low altitude, the Pic du Gar, like the Pic de Cagire, is a well-known summit of the Haute-Garonne. Its imposing silhouette dominates the high valley of the Garonne, after flowing from the Val d'Aran. Its secondary summit, the Pic Saillant (1756 m), has a summit cross.

References

External links
 Randos
 Pyrénées Team

Landforms of Haute-Garonne
Mountains of the Pyrenees
Mountains of Occitania (administrative region)